Wow Mali is the longest-running, multi-awarded and top-rated gag show in the Philippines which was aired on TV5 from May 25, 1996, to August 2, 2008, and from February 22, 2009, to June 28, 2015, originally hosted by Joey de Leon. it is currently hosted by Jose Manalo and Wally Bayola served as the hosts

The show was discontinued in May 2007 but some episodes still aired on Wow Mali Bytes and Wow Mali Express.

On February 22, 2009, Wow Mali returned to TV5. Following the network's second reformat after Holy Week, Wow Mali was set to return on April 7, 2010, airing every Wednesday at 7:30 pm. The show was again discontinued on September 1, 2010, and was replaced by a spin-off show, Wow Meganon which lasted until April 8, 2011. Its third incarnation aired on April 10, 2011, and ended on February 5, 2012. However, the management decided to revive the series in late 2013 as their fourth incarnation under a new name Wow Mali Pa Rin!

History
The Philippines got its first taste of unpretentious, candidly-captured-for-TV Filipino humor on May 25, 1996, from the reality-based comedy show WoW Mali, hosted by feted comedian Joey de Leon. Inspired by the America's Funniest Home Videos concept, WoW Mali features a plethora of video footage featuring practical jokes, bloopers and wacky segments, as well as solicited but equally hilarious video clips from the viewers. The actual stars of the show are men on the street - individual Filipinos, caught by the candid camera in bizarre and funny situations.

Gaining Currency
From its pilot episode, the innovative program's candid camera format increasingly gained popularity among viewers of all ages, even paving the way for countless WOW Mali clones that failed to topple the original show. Soon enough, WoW Mali became a household name, even adding a gem to colloquial lingo. "WOW Mali" or "NA-WOW-MALI AKO" is now the common expression whenever one makes a mistake or becomes the victim of a prank or a ruse.

For two years, the show was directed by Edgar "Bobot" Mortiz (a former teen matinee idol and part of the famous Going Bananas gang). Mortiz gave Joey de Leon a comic puppet co-host called Dennis Wrongman (as vivified by mime actor Totong Federez), another original touch. The taping of spiels and vignettes was usually held in the studio while candid shots, gag and tease segments were conducted on the streets by a daily roving crew, with the unsuspecting public as so-called "victims."

In August 1998, Ding Bolanos took over as director and brought Joey de Leon out of the studio to the outdoors. Hence, WoW Mali became a traveling show, capturing the Filipino brand of humor in different parts of the country, amid the colors and flavors of exotic places, exciting resorts and well-traveled tourist spots.

Wow Maling Mali
After almost a decade, ABC reformatted Wow Mali and retitled it Wow Maling Mali which premiered on April 23, 2005. On July 29, 2006, Wow Maling Mali morphed into Teka Mona!, but was discontinued on May 19, 2007.

Wow Mali Bytes/Express
On May 26, 2007, Wow Mali came back with a new brand, Wow Mali Bytes. It still featured skits and spoofs and gags, but with explicit humor and with no host at all.

On August 4, 2007, it changed its title to Wow Mali Express.

Wow Mali spin-offs
After the reformat of ABC5 to TV5, Lokomoko was created which shared the same concept as Wow Mali but focused on school gags. It was hosted by Alex Gonzaga, and Randolf Stamatelaky.  When TV5 was reformatted in April 2010, Lokomoko morphed into a gag show similar to Bubble Gang and Tropang Trumpo.

Another comedy gag show on TV5 was Ogags hosted by two Brazilian ladies Daiana Menezes and Ariana Barouk. Ogags ended with the return of Wow Mali.

Second revival
The show returned on February 22, 2009, on TV5 with Joey de Leon again as host. De Leon hosts the show from a studio similar to a virtual reality studio. It aired on Sundays at 6:30 PM. The show became a separate show from Lokomoko, following the renaming of the show to Lokomoko High.

Changes have been made to the second season of the show. It became live every Sunday night.  De Leon interacted with several people in a studio with a barangay plaza as the backdrop.  Sexy comedian Alyssa Alano joined him as co-host and had her own segment.  Other homegrown TV5 talents like the Baikingu Girls (from the Tuesday primetime show Baikingu) and the Smurfets (from the Wednesday primetime show Ogags) were also seen in the show as well. Richie d' Horsie was added to the cast as Joey's second sidekick.

Mahiwagang Tunog
Mahiwagang Tunog (Filipino for Mysterious Sound) was a game show incorporated into the new incarnation of Wow Mali. A video clip of someone doing a mundane task was taken, but the video itself was removed, letting the viewers hear only the sound. The host then provided a sentence with the verbs of the sentence blanked out. Through a telephone call, the home viewer attempted to guess what is that particular person doing using only the sound he heard. The winner was awarded a cash prize from an ever-growing jackpot.

Wow Meganon
On September 6, 2010, Wow Mali became Wow Meganon. Similar to Wow Maling Mali, Joey De Leon remains as the main host, together with Jeff "Mr. Fu" Espiritu, Calamity Fun, Wanlu, Miko Petito, Maui Manalo, and Jeffrey Tam as the new co-hosts of the show. Aside from the gags, it featured segments like street magic and a puppet show. The show ended on April 8, 2011.

Third revival
The third revival of Wow Mali premiered on April 10, 2011. However, it ended on February 5, 2012.

Fourth revival

The TV5 management decides to revive the program in September 2013 and named it Wow Mali Pa Rin! which will replace Talentadong Pinoy's timeslot, alongside Who Wants to be a Millionaire?, and Pinoy Explorer. The series was aired on September 15, 2013, at 8pm.

Fifth revival
A new title again as Wow Mali: Lakas Ng Tama was premiered on TV5 on June 22, 2014, with the same host funnyman Joey De Leon and various guest stars of the show.

Sixth revival
In November 2022, TV5 announced during its trade event that Wow Mali will be revived once more as part of the network's lineup for 2023. The comedic duo of Jose Manalo and Wally Bayola will host the said revival of the program.

Hosts

Main host
 Jose Manalo 
 Wally Bayola

Co-hosts
Jeffrey Espiritu - A.K.A. Mr. Fu (for Wow Meganon)

Former Co-hosts
Joey de Leon (1996-2015 Later moved to Net 25)
Mike "Pekto" Nacua - Later moved to GMA 7.
Dennis Wrongman - a puppet version of former NBA Star Dennis Rodman. (Totong Federez - Puppeteer)
Krissy - a parody of Kris Aquino (portrayed by China Tuason)
Doray Alaskadora - a parody of Dora the Explorer (portrayed by Via Antonio).

Awards
Winner, 1st MTRCB Television Awards for Best Comedy Show (2009)
Winner, KBP Golden Dove Awards for the Best Gag Show (1997, 2005 & 2009).
Nominated, PMPC Star Awards for TV's Best Gag Show (1996–2013)
Nominated, Catholic Mass Media Awards Best Comedy Show (1996–2013)

References

See also
Wow Mali Express
The Return of Wow Mali

Philippine television sketch shows
TV5 (Philippine TV network) original programming
1996 Philippine television series debuts
2008 Philippine television series endings
2009 Philippine television series debuts
2015 Philippine television series endings
1990s Philippine television series
Filipino-language television shows